Valcourt Airport  is located  south of Valcourt, Quebec, Canada.

The runway was built on the right-of-way of an old Canadian Pacific Railway branch line that once ran between the towns of Eastman and Windsor Mills, Quebec. In 2005, the  runway was repaved, with the centre  being asphalt, with gravel on each side.

References

Registered aerodromes in Estrie